Chonnasorn Sajakul (born November 18, 1996), better known by her nickname and stage name, Sorn, is a Thai singer and internet celebrity based in South Korea. She was the winner of the first season of K-Pop Star Hunt in 2011. She later debuted as a member of the South Korean girl group, CLC, under Cube Entertainment, from their debut in March 2015 until her departure from the group in November 2021. She also produces videos for her YouTube channel Produsorn (stylized in all caps), which launched in 2019. On December 3, 2021, Sorn signed with Wild Entertainment Group as a solo artist.

Early life 
As a child, her mother allowed her to have vocal lessons at the Grammy Vocal Studio, in Bangkok, to achieve her goal of becoming a singer. She was born into an affluent family. Her father, Wanasthana Sajakul, was a former member of the Thai parliament and former manager of the Thailand national football team, and her half-brother, Teerapat Sajakul, is an actor and singer in her home country.

Sorn was enrolled at an international school, in Thailand, from the age of 2. She was a student at the KIS International School in Bangkok and later graduated from the Korea Kent Foreign School in Seoul.

Career

Pre-debut 
In 2011, Sorn competed in tvN's K-Pop Star Hunt and was named winner of the first season.

Sorn moved to Korea to train at Cube Entertainment at 15. At the time, she was the company's first foreign, non-Korean trainee.

In 2012, she did a collaboration song with G.NA called "Because You Are The One," sung in English. In 2013, Sorn appeared in the documentary, Seoul: Capital of K-Pop (Inside K-Pop) where she talked about her trainee life and what it involved and appeared in a documentary which was focused on her future bandmate, Oh Seung-hee.

2015–2021: Debut and departure from CLC 

Sorn was revealed as the first member of the girl group CLC. The group officially debuted on March 19, 2015 with their debut extended play, First Love.
 
On November 16, 2021, Cube Entertainment announced the termination of Sorn's contract with the label and her departure from CLC.

Sorn participated in all CLC releases (8 mini-albums, one single album, and two digital singles) since debut till her departure from the group.

2017–present: Produsorn, solo activities, "Run", signing with Wild

On April 21, Sorn began livestreaming on the United Cube YouTube channel with her Cheat Key live series, Produsorn Live. The series ran for eight episodes until May 26, and featured her fellow CLC members. The series marked Cube Entertainment's first foray into YouTube livestreaming.

In January 2019, Sorn launched her own YouTube channel, also named Produsorn. Her videos are now uploaded exclusively on the Produsorn channel. She uploads a mixture of vlogs (day in the life, behind the scenes), song covers, Q&As, and unboxing videos. CLC members and (G)I-dle's Minnie are frequently featured on her channel. On August 18, 2021, Sorn had revealed that she deleted all her previous videos and has restarted her channel.

Sorn originally began posting videos on TikTok in early 2020. She has accumulated over 2.5 million followers on the platform, as of September 2021.

In October 2020, Sorn released her first jewellery collection, Rise, in collaboration with Kapsul Collective. In December, she was announced as a participant in the trot reality show Miss Trot 2. The show will premiere on December 17. She was eliminated in the first round.

On February 8, 2021, Sorn surprise-launched her first makeup line, Don't Waste My Time, in collaboration with VT Cosmetics. On February 11, 2021, Cube TV's Steve JobSon reality programme premiered, the show documents the creation and development of the makeup line.

From March 9, Sorn began teasing a solo release on TikTok. On March 18, 2021, Cube Entertainment confirmed that Sorn would be making her solo debut, on March 23, with the English digital single, "Run". Sorn personally participated in the cover artwork and music video for her debut single. Written and produced by Candace Sosa, "Run" is an acoustic pop song that is expected to present a charm that embodies the warm atmosphere of spring. A music video teaser was released at midnight on March 22. The music video was filmed on Jeju Island. The song and music video were released at 6pm KST on March 23, across all platforms.

Sorn featured on Emily Mei's debut single "My Domain", alongside Amber Liu. The song and music video was released on all music platforms on November 9.

On December 3, it was announced that Sorn had signed with Wild Entertainment Group as a solo artist. Sorn confirmed that she is currently working on new music, set to release in early 2022.  Sorn released her second single, "Sharp Objects", on February 25, 2022.  She released her third single, "Scorpio", on April 15, 2022, and her fourth single "Save Me", on June 24, 2022.

Activism 

In 2017, Sorn began campaigning for fair royalty payments for foreign musicians based in South Korea. In a Facebook live interview she revealed that she was being paid six times less than her Korean members, but also acknowledged that her agency tried to help the situation. In an Instagram story posted in 2019, Sorn stated that the issue had been resolved with the Federation of Korean Music Performers (FKMP).

Discography

Singles

As lead artist

Collaborations

Filmography

Television

Music videos

Radio show

Awards and nominations

References

External links

 Official site 
 

Living people
1996 births
Musicians from Bangkok
K-pop singers
Cube Entertainment artists
CLC (group) members
21st-century Thai women singers
Thai pop singers
Korean-language singers of Thailand

Thai expatriates in South Korea
Thai YouTubers